The Klimova Treasure is a hoard of Early Byzantine and Sasanian silver objects that was discovered in 1907 near the village of Klimova in the Perm Governorate of the Russian Empire (modern-day Perm Krai, in central Russia). It is one of several hoards of Byzantine and Sasanian silverware uncovered in that region, which are collectively referred to as the Perm Treasures.

Description 
Amongst the Byzantine objects from the Klimova Treasure are a dish containing an image of a goatherd which bears the silver stamps of Emperor Justinian I (r. 527–565) and two 7th-century dishes adorned with crosses. The Sasanian objects from the hoard include a dish depicting King of Kings Shapur III (383–388) slaying a leopard, as well as another which portrays a tigress beneath a tree. Other works associated with the Klimova Treasure also include an 8th or 9th century Iranian dish and a Mawarannahr piece. A bucket was also found. The Klimova Treasure is currently housed in the collections of the Hermitage Museum in Saint Petersburg.

Sources

1907 archaeological discoveries
1907 in the Russian Empire
Byzantine art
Sasanian art
Silver objects
Treasure troves in Russia
Archaeological discoveries in Russia
History of Perm Krai
Perm Governorate
Collection of the Hermitage Museum